Nyamina is a small town and rural commune in the Cercle of Koulikoro in the Koulikoro Region of south-western Mali. The commune lies to the north of the Niger River and covers an area of 1,283 km2. It includes the town of Nyamina and 47 villages. In the 2009 census the commune had a population of 35,548. The town lies on the left bank of the river, 80 km northeast of Koulikoro.

References

External links
.

Communes of Koulikoro Region